Charles Hodes (1848 – February 14, 1875) was an American professional baseball player who played as a catcher, infielder, and outfielder in the National Association for three seasons from 1871 to 1874. A Brooklyn native, Hodes played one season each for the Chicago White Stockings, Troy Haymakers, and Brooklyn Atlantics. He had a career batting average of .231 in 63 total games before dying from tuberculosis in 1875.

Early life
Hodes was born to German immigrants in Manhattan, New York, in 1848, though the exact date of his birth is unknown. His family lived in Manhattan until about 1853, when they moved to Brooklyn. There, Hodes would eventually play baseball with multiple amateur teams.

Amateur career
In 1868, Hodes joined the hometown Brooklyn Eckfords, playing for them in 1869 as well. He moved on to the Chicago White Stockings in 1870 and remained with the team the following season when they became a charter member of the National Association (NA), the first professional baseball league.

Chicago White Stockings (1871)
Hodes's first NA game with Chicago came on May 8, against the Cleveland Forest Citys at the Union Base-Ball Grounds in Chicago. Playing catcher for the team, he had two hits, two runs scored, and two runs batted in (RBI) in Chicago's 14–12 victory. Though Hodes was Chicago's main catcher during the season, manager Jimmy Wood also used him as a third baseman, shortstop, and outfielder. The White Stockings' season was interrupted on October 8, when the Great Chicago Fire consumed their ballpark, uniforms, and equipment. Other teams loaned them supplies to finish the year, and they played the rest of their regularly scheduled games on the road. Despite these challenges, the White Stockings remained in contention for the league title until the final day of the season (October 30), when they faced the Philadelphia Athletics in a game that would determine the champion. Catching that day, Hode was hitless in three at bats as Philadelphia won 4–1. In 28 games in 1871, Hodes batted .277 with 32 runs scored, 36 hits, two home runs (the only ones of his career), and 25 RBI.

Troy Haymakers (1872)
The White Stockings suspended operations after the 1871 season, but Wood was hired to manage the Troy Haymakers for 1872. He brought several of his Chicago players along, including George Zettlein, Bub McAtee, and Hodes. The catcher only appeared in 13 of the team's 25 games, but he continued to demonstrate his versatility by playing third base, shortstop, and outfield. However, Troy's season ended early on July 23, when the team's owners revealed that they would not be able to pay the players. In 13 games, Hodes batted .242 with 17 runs scored, 15 hits, and 10 RBI.

Brooklyn Atlantics (1874)
Six of Troy's former players joined the Brooklyn Eckfords for the rest of the 1872 season, but Hodes was not signed by the team. He returned to Brooklyn and played semipro baseball until 1874, when he joined the NA's Brooklyn Atlantics. This time, he was used primarily as an outfielder, though he also played the positions of catcher, second base, and first base. However, Hodes battled fatigue throughout the year, which affected his performance on the field. On July 13, he was hitless in five at bats in a 6–4 victory over the Hartford Dark Blues at the Hartford Ball Club Grounds. After that game, manager Bob Ferguson decided his player needed rest and gave him the remainder of the season off. Though Hodes did not play any more games in 1874, he did umpire four contests, the last of these coming on October 3 when the Atlantics played the Baltimore Canaries. In 21 games, he batted .148 with eight runs scored, 12 hits, and seven RBI. His three-season totals in the NA included a .231 batting average, 57 runs scored, 63 hits, and 42 RBI in 62 games.

Illness and death
Hodes's fatigue would only get worse over the offseason, as he was diagnosed with tuberculosis in mid-October. Ferguson held an exhibition game at the Union Grounds in Brooklyn on November 12 to raise funds for the player's recovery, and a benefit "hop" was held for him later that day, though the Brooklyn Eagle reported that the latter "was not so successful as might have been desired." Ferguson and Hodes's teammates also went to his house several times to encourage the ailing ballplayer. However, Hodes died of the disease on February 14, 1875. He is interred at Lutheran All Faiths Cemetery in Queens, New York.

See also
 List of baseball players who died during their careers

References

External links

Major League Baseball catchers
Major League Baseball center fielders
Brooklyn Eckfords (NABBP) players
Chicago White Stockings (NABBP) players
Chicago White Stockings players
Troy Haymakers players
Brooklyn Atlantics players
Baseball players from New York (state)
19th-century baseball players
1848 births
1875 deaths
19th-century deaths from tuberculosis
Tuberculosis deaths in New York (state)
American people of German descent